The men's 1500 metre freestyle competition of the swimming events at the 1987 Pan American Games took place on 15 August at the Indiana University Natatorium. The last Pan American Games champion was Jeff Kostoff of US.

This race consisted of thirty lengths of the pool, all lengths being in freestyle.

Results
All times are in minutes and seconds.

Heats

Final 
The final was held on August 15.

References

Swimming at the 1987 Pan American Games